Masvingo Urban is a constituency of the National Assembly of the Parliament of Zimbabwe, comprising the city of Masvingo and surrounding residential areas. It was created ahead of the 2008 general election with territory taken from the Masvingo Central constituency. Its current MP since 2018 is Jacob Nyokanhete of the Movement for Democratic Change Alliance.

Profile 
In 2008, Masvingo Urban had 31,489 registered voters. The constituency had a poverty rate of 76 percent, with animal husbandry, formal employment, cross-border trading with South Africa, and tourism at Great Zimbabwe being the leading sources of income. Masvingo Urban was ethnically diverse, with residents coming from the Karanga, Zezuru, and Manyika sub-groups of the Shona people, as well as Ndebele people.

Members

References 

2008 establishments in Zimbabwe
Constituencies established in 2008
Masvingo
Parliamentary constituencies in Zimbabwe